The Episcopal Diocese of Arkansas is part of the Episcopal Church in the United States and the worldwide Anglican Communion. The Diocese is organized into 56 congregations, with its diocesan office in Little Rock. The seat of the Bishop of Arkansas is Trinity Cathedral, Little Rock.

Notes

External links

ECUSA Province Directory
Province VII website
Journal of the Proceedings of the Annual Council of the Diocese of Arkansas at the Online Books Page

Arkansas
Christianity in Little Rock, Arkansas
Episcopal Church in Arkansas
Province 7 of the Episcopal Church (United States)